Tamsui is a metro station in New Taipei, Taiwan served by Taipei Metro. The location of the station can be traced back to the same-named station of the now-defunct Tamsui railway line. Tamsui station is the northernmost metro station in Taiwan.

Station overview

The two-level, elevated station has an island platform and two exits. The station is situated between the south side of Zhongzheng West Road and west of the Zhongshan-Zhongzheng Road intersection. Restrooms are located inside the main entrance area.

The station is heavily used by people looking to visit the sea-side district of Tamsui. It connects Tamsui River, Tamsui Sunset Scenic Area, Riverside Park, Tamsui River Bike Route, Tamsui District Office, Tamsui Old Street, Tamsui Church and Yingzhuan Road Night Market.

Like several stations (most interchange stations and all stations in Wenhu Line and Circular Line) in the network, Tamsui station does not grant commuters with non-folded bicycle access to the station building. Bike commuters are required to alight at Hongshulin station, 2.7 kilometers away from Tamsui station.

History
The renovated station opened in 1951. On 15 July 1988, the station was closed with the ending of service on the TRA Tamsui line. It had two side platforms. Construction of the new Tamsui station began on 15 December 1988 for the opening on 28 March 1997 under Taipei Metro Tamsui line.

From 1999 up to 2014, trains from Xindian terminated at Tamsui Station while construction work was conducted on the Songshan-Xindian Line.

Around the station 
 Tamsui Art Gallery
 Tamsui Customs Wharf
 Tamsui Historical Museum

First and Last Train Timing 
The first and last train timing for Tamsui station  is as follows:

References

Tamsui–Xinyi line stations
Railway stations opened in 1997
Railway stations opened in 1901
Railway stations closed in 1988